"57 Channels (And Nothin' On)" is a song written and performed by American musician Bruce Springsteen, appearing on his album Human Touch, released in 1992. The song was released as a single, charting in the top 100 in various countries. A video for the song was also released. The title may be a reference to cable television, which carries more channels than terrestrial television.

Music video
The accompanying music video illustrates the song's narrative, culminating in a recreation of Ant Farm's infamous 1975 "Media Burn" stunt, wherein a speeding car crashes through a pyramid of television sets. The same art collective was also responsible for Cadillac Ranch, immortalized in the Bruce Springsteen song of the same name (from The River). Springsteen also plays a bass, which he also played in the recording.

In a September 2014 post on Facebook discussing the video, Springsteen wrote, "Shot back in the quaint days of only 57 channels and no flat screen TVs, I have no idea what we were aiming for in this one outside of some vague sense of 'hipness' and an attempt at irony. Never my strong suit, it reads now to me as a break from our usual approach and kind of a playful misfire."

Personnel
According to authors Philippe Margotin and Jean-Michel Guesdon:

 Bruce Springsteen – vocals, bass
 Jeff Porcaro – drums, percussion
 Roy Bittan – keyboards

Charts

Release history

References

1992 singles
1992 songs
Bruce Springsteen songs
Columbia Records singles
Song recordings produced by Chuck Plotkin
Song recordings produced by Jon Landau
Songs about television
Songs written by Bruce Springsteen